Uppina Kagada is a 2017 Indian Kannada-language drama film directed by B. Suresha and starring T. S. Nagabharana and Apoorva Bharadwaj.

Cast  
T. S. Nagabharana as Aachaari, the father
Apoorva Bharadwaj as the daughter
Mandya Ramesh as Chinnayya

Production 
The film was shot in Kudremukh for sixteen days. T. S. Nagabharana and newcomer Apoorva Bharadwaj were cast in the lead roles. The film is directed by B. Suresha. The film is based on two real stories in Afghanistan and Bagalkot. The film was produced by Saranya Nag, B. Suresha's wife who had previously produced his other directorial ventures.

Release 
The film was screened at Bengaluru International Film Festival. A critic from The Hindu noted that "However, unlike his earlier works, including Devara Naadalli and Puttakkana Highway, which were termed too ‘verbose’, this film is more poetic and subtle".

Awards and nominations

References

External links 

2010s Kannada-language films
Indian drama films
Films scored by V. Harikrishna
2017 drama films
Films directed by B. Suresha